Embleya is an genus of Actinomycetota in the family Streptomycetaceae.

References 

Streptomycineae
Bacteria genera